Genoplesium calopterum is a small terrestrial orchid endemic to New Caledonia. It was first formally described in 1876 by Heinrich Gustav Reichenbach who gave it the name Prasophyllum calopterum and published the description in the journal Linnaea - Ein Journal für die Botanik in ihrem ganzen Umfange. In 1989 David Jones and Mark Clements changed the name to Genoplesium calopterum. It grows on the island of Grande Terre.

References

External links
 

calopterum
Flora of New Caledonia
Plants described in 1876